Below is a list of television series and feature films based on characters and concepts that have appeared in IDW Publishing publications, including its various imprints. This list includes live action and animated television series and films.

Television

Live-action

Web series

Pilots

Animated series

From IDW Imprints

Top Shelf Productions

Film

Live-action

Animated

Reception

Box office

Critical and public reception

See also
 List of IDW Publishing publications

References

Lists of films based on comics
Lists of television series based on works
 
Lists of films and television series